The Butterfly Super Sky Cycle is an American homebuilt roadable gyroplane designed and manufactured by The Butterfly Aircraft LLC.

Design
The Super Sky Cycle is a pusher gyroplane with tricycle undercarriage and belt drive propulsion. A second two cycle engine drives the main wheels. A Kevlar tail provides directional control in flight. The rotors are able to be folded for road travel. Two  tanks are mounted in reserve.

Specifications

References

External links

 Youtube video
 Youtube video

Homebuilt aircraft
Roadable aircraft
Single-engined pusher autogyros